René Morf (born 19 October 1969) is a retired Swiss football defender.
He holds the record for the most competitive games played for FC Lugano, the team he played during his entire career.

References

1969 births
People from Winterthur
Living people
Swiss men's footballers
FC Lugano players
Association football defenders
Swiss Super League players
Switzerland under-21 international footballers
Sportspeople from the canton of Zürich